"White Mice" is a special edition sketch of the BBC sitcom, Only Fools and Horses, first broadcast on 24 December 1985 on BBC Breakfast Time.

Synopsis
A spoof investigation of Del Boy is conducted by the BBC Breakfast show, Breakfast Time, over allegations that he sold white mice to a customer with the promise that they would turn into horses at midnight. It sees the BBC's consumer expert, Lynn Faulds Wood (playing herself) attempting to quiz Del for misleading Mr Buttons, described by Del as a "wally in a funny hat", about some mice he had sold him with the promise that they would turn into horses. After failing to persuade her to go out with him for a curry, Del quickly leaves.

Episode cast

1985 British television episodes
Only Fools and Horses special episodes